Runer Jonsson (29 June 1916 — 29 October 2006) was a Swedish journalist and author. He was editor of Nybro Tidning and the author of the Vicke Viking series of children's books adapted into the animated series Vicky the Viking. At the age of 13, Jonsson was already working for the newspaper Nybro Tidning, and at 19 he became its sole editor in 1936. In this position, he distinguished himself primarily by harsh criticism of National Socialism.

Works
 Släpp farmor och kusinerna! (1970)
 Vad ger ni för Johan? (1971)
 Göran i riddarskolan (1972)
 Demonstranterna (1978)
 Kung Karls trosspojke (1980)
 Min gode vän Rånaren (1981)
 Jens, jag och unionen (1982)
 Det finns inga matchhjältar (1983)
 Den röda baskern (1993)

Awards
1965 Deutscher Jugendliteraturpreis
1970 Landstingets kulturpris
1984 Litteraturfrämjandets stora pris
1996 Emil-priset

References 

1916 births
2006 deaths
Swedish children's writers
20th-century Swedish journalists